Hayden Creek is a stream in the U.S. state of Minnesota.

Hayden Creek was named for an early settler.

See also
List of rivers of Minnesota

References

Rivers of Cass County, Minnesota
Rivers of Todd County, Minnesota
Rivers of Wadena County, Minnesota
Rivers of Minnesota